Tolpygo is a Russian and Ukrainian surname. Notable people with the surname include:

 Boris Tolpygo, Soviet communist politician
 Kirill Tolpygo, Soviet Ukrainian scientist
 Sergey K. Tolpygo, scientist working on superconductivity
 Alexander S. Tolpygo, Chief Operating Officer of SFL Scientific

Russian-language surnames
Ukrainian-language surnames